Pseudotrichomonas keilini is a species of excavates that was discovered by Ann Bishop in 1939.

References

External links

Metamonads
Species described in 1939